ARB 24 (an abbreviation from Azerbaijani Republic Broadcaster 24) — is the first news TV channel in Azerbaijan.

It was founded under the name of "Türkel TV" in Tovuz on June 1, 2010. Carrying out regional broadcasting in early years The TV channel switched to the news format in 2012 and started broadcasting through the "Azerspace-1" satellite since April 10, 2015.

The TV channel was rebranded as "ARB 24" on September 19, 2016.

On December 28, 2017, a perpetual license was granted to "ARB 24" TV channel as a result of the nationwide television broadcasting competition in order to establish a specialized (news) television channel announced by the National Television and Radio Council.

From November 27, 2018, as a specialized news channel, "ARB 24" had started broadcasting from Baku in FULL HD format through the republic.

The satellite parameters are inscribed as: Azerspace 46, 11024 MHz, Vert., S/R 12700.
"ARB 24" TV channel presents news programs with and without a host each hour a day.

In addition, the daily "İşgüzar səhər" ("Business morning"), "İş vaxtı" ("Working time") and "Nə baş verir" ("What's happening?") news marathons, as well as the "Oyundan kənar" ("Outside the Game") sports project, weekly "Peşəkar mübahisə" ("Professional Debate"), "Həftəyə baxış” ("Weekly Review"), as well as "Gündəm" ("Agenda") socio-political programs are available to audience. The programs like "Business Lady", "Kreativ sənaye" ("Creative Industry"), "Fokusda" ("On the Focus") and "Gələcəyin peşəsi" ("Profession of the Future") broadcast once a week are also watched with great interest.

"ARB 24" TV channel broadcasts "Tomorrow Today", "Global-3000", "In good shape", "REV" and "Reporter" programs within the cooperation agreement with "Deutsche Welle". 

In addition, within the cooperation with distribution companies, Bloomberg's "The Rubenstein Show: Peer to Peer" project and various documentaries on global topics are presented.

"ARB 24" also cooperates with the world's leading news agencies such as "Reuters", "Associated Press" and "Anadolu Agency".

"ARB 24" TV channel has undertaken the mission of delivering accurate, impartial and hot information with the slogan "Our time is valuable".

References

External links 
 Official website 

Television networks in Azerbaijan
Azerbaijani-language television stations
Television stations in Azerbaijan
Television channels and stations established in 2010
Azerbaijani companies established in 2010